Vachellia prasinata (syn. Acacia prasinata) is a species of plant in the family Fabaceae. It is found only in Ethiopia. It is threatened by habitat loss.

References

prasinata
Flora of Ethiopia
Vulnerable plants
Taxonomy articles created by Polbot